John William Charles Darbourne CBE (11 January 1935 – 29 September 1991) was a British architect, who together with fellow architect Geoffrey Darke, founded Darbourne & Darke in 1961. 

In 1961 Darbourne won a housing competition for his plans for the Lillington Gardens estate in Westminster, London, his later work including designing a stand for Chelsea Football Club at Stamford Bridge and the landscaping of Heathrow Airport. In October 1987 the Darbourne & Darke partnership was dissolved and Darbourne set up his own company known as Darbourne & Partners Ltd, based in Richmond, London.

Darbourne was appointed Commander of the Order of the British Empire in the 1977 New Years Honours for his services to architecture.

Darbourne died on 29 September 1991, aged 56.

References

1935 births
1991 deaths
Architects from London
Burials at St Peter's, Petersham
Commanders of the Order of the British Empire